The 7th Solheim Cup Match was held between September 20 and September 22, 2002 at Interlachen Country Club, Edina, Minnesota, USA. Team USA won the trophy for the fifth time by a score of 15 to 12 points. Rosie Jones gained the winning point in her victory over Karine Icher.

This was the last Solheim Cup to be held in an even-numbered year, as the next Solheim Cup would take place in 2003 and every odd-numbered year thereafter.

Teams
The European team was supposed to be made up of seven automatic qualifiers and five wild card picks but there was a tie for seventh position so there were eight automatic qualifiers and only four picks from Captain Dale Reid. The US team consisted of 10 automatic qualifiers and two picks from Captain Patty Sheehan.

Europe
Captain
 Dale Reid - Ladybank, Scotland
Automatic qualifiers
 Annika Sörenstam - Stockholm, Sweden
 Raquel Carriedo - Zaragoza, Spain
 Karine Icher - Châteauroux, France
 Paula Martí - Barcelona, Spain
 Sophie Gustafson - Särö, Sweden
 Suzann Pettersen - Oslo, Norway
 Iben Tinning - Copenhagen, Denmark
 Maria Hjorth - Falun, Sweden
Captains Picks
 Laura Davies - Coventry, England
 Helen Alfredsson - Gothenburg, Sweden
 Carin Koch - Kungalv, Sweden
 Mhairi McKay - Glasgow, Scotland

Captain
Patty Sheehan - Middlebury, Vermont
Automatic qualifiers
Juli Inkster - Santa Cruz, California
Laura Diaz - Scotia, New York
Rosie Jones - Santa Ana, California
Michele Redman - Zanesville, Ohio
Cristie Kerr - Miami, Florida
Meg Mallon - Natick, Massachusetts
Beth Daniel - Charleston, South Carolina
Wendy Ward - San Antonio, Texas
Emilee Klein - Santa Monica, California
Kelli Kuehne - Dallas, Texas
Captains Picks
Kelly Robbins - Mt. Pleasant, Michigan
Pat Hurst - San Leandro, California

Format
The match format was slightly changed from 2000. A total of 28 points were available, divided among four periods of team play, followed by one period of singles play. The first period, on Friday morning, was four rounds of foursomes. This was followed in the afternoon by four rounds of fourballs. This schedule was repeated on the Saturday morning and afternoon. The four periods on Friday and Saturday accounted for 16 points. During these team periods, the players played in teams of two. All players had to play in at least one session of the first two days. The final 12 points were decided in a round of singles matchplay, in which all 24 players (12 from each team) took part.

Day one
Friday, September 20, 2002

Morning foursomes

Afternoon fourball

Day two
Saturday, September 21, 2002

Morning foursomes

Afternoon fourball

Day three
Sunday, September 22, 2002

Singles

Individual player records
Each entry refers to the win–loss–half record of the player.

United States

Europe

Notes and references

External links
Solheim Cup Match Results

Solheim Cup
Golf in Minnesota
Sports competitions in Minnesota
Sports in Minneapolis–Saint Paul
Solheim Cup
Solheim Cup
Solheim Cup
Solheim Cup
Women's sports in Minnesota